Sir Reginald William Skelton  (3 June 1872 – 5 September 1956) was a British vice-admiral and engineer who served as chief engineer and official photographer of the 1901-1904 Discovery Expedition to Antarctica.

Early life
Skelton was born at Long Sutton, Lincolnshire, and educated at Bromsgrove School, Worcestershire. He joined the Royal Navy in 1887 and until 1892 studied at the Royal Naval Engineering College at Keyham, Devon. Once commissioned he served on HMS Centurion in China from 1894 to 1897 and HMS Majestic of the Channel Squadron from 1899 to 1900 before being appointed to supervise the building of the Discovery for the 1901 National Antarctic Expedition.

Polar exploration
Scott, the expedition leader, had been impressed with Skelton's engineering abilities aboard the Majestic and so he was appointed Chief Engineer of the expedition. He also acted as expedition photographer. Nicknamed 'Skelly', there were no serious difficulties with any of the machinery under Skelton's care throughout the three-year expedition. Once established on the continent he became a well-respected member of the team (Huxley 1978), eventually having four features named after him: an inlet, a glacier, an icefall and a lévé.

On his return he married his fiancée, the New Zealander Sybil Devenish-Meares of Christchurch: they had two daughters and a son.

Later life

From 1906 to 1912 and again between 1916 and 1918, Skelton served in the submarine service. He hoped to be Scott's second-in-command for the Terra Nova Expedition of 1910-1913 but was overlooked in favour of Edward Evans who had been planning his own expedition to Antarctica but agreed to join Scott's expedition provided he was offered the position of second-in-command. During the First World War Skelton was awarded the DSO for his actions at the Battle of Jutland, 31 May 1916. Appointed CB in 1919 for his work in North Russia, he continued to rise through the service after the War, being posted to Archangel, Constantinople, to the Mediterranean Station and to the Atlantic Station. He became Engineer Rear-Admiral in 1923, Engineer Vice-Admiral in 1928 and Engineer-in-Chief of the Fleet, Admiralty, 1928–32. He was knighted in the 1931 New Year Honours. and retired in 1932.

He died in 1956, aged 84, at his home in Aldingbourne.

References

Bibliography
 Obituary by Michael Barne The Geographical Journal, Vol. 122, No. 4 (Dec., 1956), pp. 533–534
Scott Fiennes, R. (2003 London Coronet) 
Scott of the Antarctic Huxley, E.J.G (1978 London, Atheneum) 
 Discovery Illustrated J V Skelton, J.V. &  Wilson, D.W. (2001). Reardon Publishing. 
 The Antarctic Journals of Reginald Skelton:  Skelton, J.V. (Ed) (2004, Reardon Publishing). 

1872 births
People educated at Bromsgrove School
Recipients of the Polar Medal
Royal Navy vice admirals
Presidents of the Smeatonian Society of Civil Engineers
1956 deaths
Knights Commander of the Order of the Bath
Commanders of the Order of the British Empire
People from Long Sutton, Lincolnshire
People from Aldingbourne